Chris Washington (born 18 March 1989) is an English stand-up comedian.

Early life
Washington is a native of Golborne. He attended  St Aelred's Roman Catholic High School in Newton-le-Willows, Merseyside. Washington worked as a postman for eleven years before becoming a comedian, confessing that he had used all his annual leave in one go to travel to the Edinburgh Fringe in August.

Career
Washington was nominated for best newcomer in the 2017 lastminute.com Edinburgh Comedy Awards for his show Dream Big (Within Reason).

He has made TV appearances on Live from the BBC, Mock the Week and, in October 2021, Richard Osman's House of Games. In late 2021, Washington also appeared, as himself, in an advertisement for the Nationwide Building Society.

Also had a famous victory in battle of the celebs, in the Lowton community darts league.
Against Oliver Marshall

References

External links

English stand-up comedians
Living people
1989 births
People from Wigan
21st-century English comedians